Jana Vollmer (also known as Jana Vollmerová, née Pechová, born May 5, 1973 in Mladá Boleslav) is a female former beach volleyball player from Germany, who was born in Czechoslovakia. Her family were of minority Bohemian German descent. In 1994, she played as part of the Czech Republic women's national volleyball team, featuring in the 1994 FIVB Volleyball Women's World Championship, where the Czech Republic finished ninth. On club level she played with SV Tubbingen.

Partnering Danja Müsch she claimed the silver medal for Germany at the 2000 European Championships in Bilbao, Spain.

Playing partners
 Andrea Ahmann
 Danja Müsch
 Ines Pianka
 Ulrike Schmidt

References

External links
 

1973 births
Living people
Czech beach volleyball players
German women's beach volleyball players
Sportspeople from Kassel
Sportspeople from Mladá Boleslav
Volleyball players from Berlin
Czech people of German descent
Academic staff of Leipzig University